Lorenz Becker was a member of the Wisconsin State Assembly. He was elected in 1932 as a Democrat. Becker was born on August 10, 1889 in Woodland, Wisconsin.

References

People from Sauk County, Wisconsin
Year of birth missing
Year of death missing
Democratic Party members of the Wisconsin State Assembly